The Van Zuylen van Nijevelt cabinet was the cabinet of the Netherlands from 1 June 1866 until 4 June 1868. The cabinet was formed by Independent Conservatives (Ind. Con.) after the election of 1866. The right-wing cabinet was a minority government in the House of Representatives. Independent Liberal Conservative Jules van Zuylen van Nijevelt was Prime Minister.

Cabinet members

 Resigned.
 Served ad interim.
 Died in office.

References

External links
Official

  Kabinet-Van Zuylen van Nijevelt Parlement & Politiek

Cabinets of the Netherlands
1866 establishments in the Netherlands
Cabinets established in 1866
Cabinets disestablished in 1868
Minority governments